Fougner is a surname. Notable people with the surname include:

Brit Fougner (born 1946), Norwegian politician
Christopher Simonsen Fougner (1795–1869), Norwegian politician
Else Bugge Fougner (born 1944), Norwegian lawyer and politician
G. Selmer Fougner (1885–1941), American wine and restaurant critic
Gunnar Fougner (1911–1995), Norwegian architect
Kristian Fougner (1919–2012), Norwegian engineer and resistance member
Sigurd Fougner (1879–1959), Norwegian judge
Simen Fougner (1701–1783), Norwegian farmer, poet and non-fiction writer